Ponder High School is a public high school located in Ponder, Texas (USA) and classified as a 3A school by the UIL. It is part of the Ponder Independent School District located in southwestern Denton County. In 2015, the school was rated "Met Standard" by the Texas Education Agency.

Shawn Simmons is the principal of the school.

The school district boundary, and therefore the high school attendance zone, includes Ponder, DISH, and portions of Denton and Northlake.

Athletics
The Ponder Lions compete in these sports - 

Baseball
Basketball
Cross Country
Football
Golf
Powerlifting
Softball
Tennis
Track and Field
Volleyball

State Titles
Boys Basketball - 
2001(2A), 2008(2A), 2009(2A), 2010(2A), 2014(2A)

State Finalist
Baseball - 
1993(2A), 2004(2A)
Boys Basketball - 
2006(2A)

References

External links
Ponder ISD
Ponder Athletic Booster Club

Public high schools in Texas
High schools in Denton County, Texas